Irvine Wallace "Ace" Bailey (July 3, 1903 – April 7, 1992) was a Canadian professional ice hockey player. He played for the Toronto Maple Leafs for eight seasons, from 1926–1933. His playing career ended with a fight he encountered during a game against the Boston Bruins; he was severely injured in the resulting scrum. He is the first professional sports player to have a jersey number retired in his honour. Bailey led the NHL in scoring in 1929, and was inducted into the Hockey Hall of Fame in 1975.

Playing career
Born in Bracebridge, Ontario, Bailey grew up in Toronto and attended the University of Toronto. After two years in university he joined the junior Toronto St. Mary's in the Ontario Hockey Association. He played senior hockey in Peterborough for two seasons (1924–1926) and in November 1926 was signed by the Toronto St. Patricks of the National Hockey League, renamed the Toronto Maple Leafs in his first season with the team. He was the leading scorer and goal scorer in the NHL in the 1928–29 season, with 22 goals and 32 points in 44 games. He was again the Leafs' leading scorer in 1929–30 and one point short of repeating in 1930–31. After three consecutive 20-goal seasons, his offensive production declined in the 1931–32 season. Bailey still helped Toronto win the Stanley Cup in 1932, scoring the Cup-winning goal in game 3 of the finals.

Bailey's career came to an abrupt end on December 12, 1933, when he was hit from behind by Eddie Shore of the Boston Bruins, and hit his head on the ice, fracturing his skull; he convulsed on the ice of the Boston Garden. This occurred after Maple Leafs teammate King Clancy upended Shore with a hard check as the latter player rushed up the ice. Angry, dazed, and thinking he was going after Clancy, Shore rushed at Bailey intent on revenge. Another teammate, Red Horner knocked Shore out cold with one punch after the incident. It was feared that Bailey would not survive after severely injuring his head. He came out of a coma for the second time 10 days later, making a full recovery, but did not play professionally again. When he was assured that Bailey would survive, league president Frank Calder suspended Shore for 16 games. An all-star benefit game was held at Maple Leaf Gardens on February 14, 1934, which raised $20,909 for Bailey and his family. Bailey and Shore shook hands and embraced at centre ice before the game began. Thirteen years later, the NHL introduced an annual all-star game.

Bailey's #6 sweater was the first ever to be retired by an NHL team, and is one of the 13 numbers (19 players) to have been permanently retired by the Maple Leafs. In 1968 Bailey asked it be unretired so Ron Ellis could wear it. Over his career, Bailey totaled 111 goals and 82 assists in 313 games.

Post-playing career and death

Following his career-ending injury, Bailey asked the NHL if he could work as a linesman, but he was turned down. He coached the University of Toronto Varsity Blues men's ice hockey team from 1935 to 1940 and again after World War II from 1945 to 1949, winning three Canadian Interuniversity Athletics Union championships. He also worked as a timekeeper at Maple Leaf Gardens from 1938 to 1984, when the 81-year-old Bailey was told by Gardens owner Harold Ballard that his services were no longer needed. On April 1, 1992 Bailey's number was again retired by the Maple Leafs; that same day Bailey had a stroke, and he died on April 7, 1992 of lung failure at the age of 88.

Legacy
Bailey was inducted into the Hockey Hall of Fame in 1975. Named in his honour, the Ace Bailey Memorial ice hockey tournament for youth players is held annually in Stoney Creek, Ontario.

Bailey's jersey number was the first to ever be retired in professional sports; it was retired by the Maple Leafs' then-owner Conn Smythe at the game organized for his benefit.

Transactions
 November 3, 1926 - Signed as a free agent by the Toronto Maple Leafs

Awards and achievements
 1928–29 – NHL Scoring Leader
 1932 – Stanley Cup champion
 February 14, 1934 – #6 jersey retired by the Toronto Maple Leafs; first ever number retirement in professional sports
 1975 – Hockey Hall of Fame, honoured member

Career statistics

Regular season and playoffs

See also
 Ace Bailey Benefit Game
 List of past NHL scoring leaders

References

External links

 

1903 births
1992 deaths
Canadian ice hockey left wingers
Deaths from respiratory failure
Hockey Hall of Fame inductees
Ice hockey people from Toronto
National Hockey League scoring leaders (prior to 1947–48)
National Hockey League players with retired numbers
Ontario Hockey Association Senior A League (1890–1979) players
People from Bracebridge, Ontario
Stanley Cup champions
Toronto Maple Leafs players